Ava Vitali is a fictional character and former antagonist from Days of Our Lives, an American soap opera on the NBC network. Created by and introduced by then-executive producers Ken Corday and Edward J. Scott, the role is portrayed by Tamara Braun, who won a Daytime Emmy Award for the role in 2009. Introduced as a "mysterious woman from Steve's past," Ava was later revealed as a woman from a Mafia family. Ava appeared for six months in 2008, and returned in December 2015 for a three-month guest appearance. Following a brief voice appearance in 2017, Ava returned to the show on a regular basis in November 2020. She departed again on December 20, 2022.

Casting

In January 2008, it was announced that Tamara Braun, best known as the second actress to portray the character of Carly Corinthos on the ABC Daytime drama, General Hospital, had been cast. The casting of Braun originally brought up fan speculation that she would be coming in as previous established character, Sarah Horton, daughter of veteran character, Maggie Horton. This speculation was quickly put to rest when it was announced that Braun would join as Ava. Braun originally aired for 6 months from February 8 to August 4, 2008. Following the completion of her run as Ava, it was announced in September 2008 that Braun would join All My Children as Reese Williams, current girlfriend of the show's iconic Bianca Montgomery. Braun went on to win a Daytime Emmy Award for Outstanding Supporting Actress for her portrayal of Ava.

Braun later returned to Days of our Lives in the role of Taylor Walker, replacing her former General Hospital co-star Natalia Livingston.

In July 2015, it was announced that Braun is reprising the role of Ava, as part of the show's fiftieth anniversary celebration, first airing on December 9. Braun departed on March 1, 2016.

Actress Sara Fletcher voiced Ava one episode in 2017, airing April 10. On September 2, 2020, Soap Opera Digest exclusively announced that Braun would again reprise the role of Ava. She returned during the November 13, 2020, episode.

Storylines

2008
Ava first appears in early February 2008, stalking Steve Johnson – a man she calls "Patch" – and the Brady family with whom he is traveling with in Ireland. Obsessed with Steve, she continues to stalk the hotel where he was residing. In an attempt to delay Steve and the rest of the Brady family's departure from Ireland, she sabotages their plane. Her plan, however, goes wrong when the plane began experiencing problems in mid-air, causing the death of Brady patriarch Shawn Brady. After following Steve back to Salem, she sees him hug Hope Williams Brady outside of Steve's apartment door. She then interrogates Hope, asking if she was in love with Steve. Scared off by Hope, Ava immediately leaves the grounds. Ava then runs into Steve, promising to exact her revenge against him and his family for leaving her without a goodbye. Looking at photos of the crash victims, she stops at Hope's, wondering who she was and why she loved her dear, "Patch".

Convinced that Hope is Steve's wife, Ava is visited by a therapist, who questions her sense of reality. Escaping from her guards, Ava kidnaps Hope, whom she believes is Steve's wife Kayla Brady, and holds her hostage at the Vitali compound. Driven with rage, Ava demands Hope call Steve, who catches onto the scheme and calls Hope's husband, Bo Brady and tells him to not involve the police.

Ava then pressures Steve to have sex with her, a suggestion Steve denies doing, blaming his injuries from the plane crash. Ava, however, plans to seduce Steve in hopes of making whom she believed as Kayla jealous. Before she can execute her plan, Bo and the real Kayla infiltrate the Vitali compound. Ava, in turn, orders her guards to kill them all. When they fail, Ava shoots Hope; Bo then goes to shoot Ava, but is protected by Steve. When questioned by a hurt Hope about why she hates Steve so much, Ava goes into detail about her "almost wedding day" of how Steve left her. Steve explains that while he had doubts about the wedding, he was abducted by Stefano DiMera's henchmen. Though shocked by the revelation, Ava becomes agitated and pops pills. Able to escape, Bo calls Abe Carver, who arrives to the Vitali compound with Roman Brady. Abe and Roman are able to calm the situation, arresting Ava. While under arrest, Kayla reveals that the pills Ava was taking, were the cause of her paranoia over Steve and the Brady family. As a result of her actions, Ava's father, Martino Vitali, shows up in Salem.

Later, Lexie Carver releases Ava into police custody. Roman then informs Ava that her bail has been paid and that she was free to go. Ava's cousin, Angelo, then reveals that it was her father Martino who had her drugged. When Martino pulls a gun out, he is shot and killed by Bo. Putting her past behind her, Ava accepts a date with John Black. When it is revealed that a warehouse shipment of John's has gone up in flames, Ava urges John, with the assistance of Philip Kiriakis to fight back. When John's estranged wife, Marlena Evans, shows up and sees him entertaining Ava, he makes it clear that they haven't been husband and wife since his accident earlier in the year, and that he was now moving on with his life with Ava. When news of a disk comes out that may contain the key to restoring John's memories, he admits to Marlena, Philip and Ava that he knew about said disk, and in a shocking decision, kisses Ava.

Moving on with their lives, Ava and John later toast to their newfound relationship. Trusting Ava, John reveals his plans concerning the recent disappearance of Paul Hollingsworth and his plans to pin the disappearance on Philip. When Ava's faced with possible charges of the plane crash earlier in the year, she hires EJ DiMera as her attorney. When EJ alerts Ava that the new judge in her trial could not be bribed, she breaks bail and makes the decision to leave the country.

2015–2017, 2020–2022
In December 2015, Ava manipulates Joey (James Lastovic), Steve and Kayla's underage teenage son, into "helping" her reunite his parents to orchestrate her plan of revenge. Joey is unaware of her past. Steve and Kayla discover Ava is back in Salem and assume Joey has been working with her, but he denies it. After months of Ava preying on Joey, he admits to her that he is in love with her and he kisses her but Ava rejects his advances and reveals that she is "dying" from leukemia. Kayla finds them together talking in her hotel room and demands that Joey stay away from Ava. Ava continues to manipulate Joey's romantic feelings for her and his attraction to her only grows stronger. Joey confides in Steve about his feelings for Ava and is shocked to learn about Ava's past and that she may have given birth to Steve's son. Ava knocks Kayla unconscious, causing a hematoma, and kidnaps her.  Ava then coerces Steve to either have sex with her or she'll let Kayla die to which Steve agrees under duress in order to secure Kayla's release. She then gives Joey Kayla's location to free her. Steve is reunited with his family but Steve's "betrayal" leaves Joey angry and bitter. Learning that Ava planned on framing his mother for attempted murder (she drugged herself with morphine in Kayla's home) a drunken Joey smothers a drugged Ava in a hospital bed, with Steve willingly implicating himself in the murder.

In November 2020, Ava returns to Salem, alive and working with Philip Kiriakis (Jay Kenneth Johnson). It is revealed that Ava was revived by Wilhelm Rolf (William Utay)'s formula that brings the dead back to life. She tells Kristen DiMera (Stacy Haiduk) that she pulled herself out of the fire at the lab back in 2018. She reunites with her son, Tripp Dalton (Lucas Adams) after she catches Allie Horton (Lindsay Arnold)—who has accused him of raping her in London—holding him at gun point. Later, Kayla has Ava arrested for her kidnapping; in-exchange for dropping the charges, Ava agrees to not press attempted murder charges against Joey, allowing him to be released from prison. Ava then meets with her other son, Charlie Dale (Mike Manning), who is working as an intern for Titan Enterprises in order to keep an eye on Phillip and Xander Kiriakis (Paul Telfer) per his mother's instructions. When Ava discovers it was Charlie and not Tripp who raped Allie, she confronts him with the truth. Scared, Charlie confesses his crimes and knocks her unconscious. Charlie is later murdered by Jan Spears (Heather Lindell), who wants to frame her enemy, Belle Black (Martha Madison), for the crime. Ava later starts a relationship with Rafe Hernandez (Galen Gering), which his sister, Gabi Hernandez (Camila Banus), disapproves of. Rafe later cheats on Ava with his ex Nicole Walker (Arianne Zucker), and Ava subsequently receives a package from Kristen (who is hiding at a convent) containing a mask of Sarah Horton which Ava gives to Xander's girlfriend Gwen so she can manipulate him. Ava then invites Rafe and Nicole to dinner, even as Rafe suspects that Ava has framed him for planting evidence in two separate police investigations.

References

External links 
Soapcentral.com | About DAYS: Who's Who in Salem | Ava Vitali
Days of our Lives Cast - Ava Vitali

Days of Our Lives characters
Fictional gangsters
Fictional businesspeople
Female characters in television
Television characters introduced in 2008
Fictional characters incorrectly presumed dead